Shaumyan is the name of several rural localities in Russia.

Modern localities
Shaumyan, Republic of Adygea, a khutor in Maykopsky District of the Republic of Adygea; 
Shaumyan, Republic of Crimea, a selo in Saksky District of the Republic of Crimea
Shaumyan, Krasnodar Krai, a selo in Shaumyansky Rural Okrug of Tuapsinsky District in Krasnodar Krai;

Alternative names
Shaumyan, alternative name of Shaumyanovsky, a khutor in Shaumyanovskoye Rural Settlement of Yegorlyksky District in Rostov Oblast;

Notes